The 1930 Campeonato Paulista, organized by the APEA (Associação Paulista de Esportes Atléticos), was the 29th season of São Paulo's top association football league. Corinthians won the title for the 8th time. No teams were relegated and the top scorer was Santos's Feitiço with 37 goals.

System
The championship was disputed in a double-round robin system, with the team with the most points winning the title.

Championship

Top Scores 1930

References

Campeonato Paulista seasons
Paulista